Sebastian Fabijański (born 14 June 1987) is a Polish film, television and theatre actor.

Biography
Sebastian Fabijański was born 14 June 1987 in Warsaw.
He studied acting in Wyższa Szkoła Komunikowania i Mediów Społecznych in Warsaw, then law in the University of Warsaw and again acting in National Academy of Theatre Arts in Kraków and in Aleksander Zelwerowicz National Academy of Dramatic Art in Warsaw. In 2015 Fabijański graduated from Aleksander Zelwerowicz National Academy of Dramatic Art in Warsaw with a MA degree in Acting.

In 2014 he won an award for the Professional Acting Debut at the 39th Polish Film Festival in Gdynia for his roles in films Jeziorak (English title Waterline) and 'Miasto 44 (english title Warsaw 44).

In 2015 he won an Andrzej Konic Award for Acting Debut at the 29th Tarnów Film Awards for his roles in films '''Waterline (original title Jeziorak) and Warsaw 44 (original title Miasto 44).

Career
Fabijański debuted on a small screen in 2009 in a guest role in a TV series Plebania, followed by a main role in two seasons of TV series Tancerze (English title Dancers). In 2014 he appeared in films Jeziorak and Warsaw 44, for which he received awards for best acting debut at 39th Polish Film Festival in Gdynia and at 29th Tarnów Film Awards.

His breakthrough roles came in 2016 when he starred as Adrian Kuś in a popular TV series Belfer and as Remigiusz Puchalski vel. Sugar in a Patryk Vega directed film Pitbull. Niebezpieczne Kobiety (English title Pitbull. Tough Women).

In 2018 he played main role in a Filip Bajon directed film Kamerdyner, which premiered at 43rd Polish Film Festival in Gdynia.

In 2019 he played lead roles in Birds Talk (Mowa Ptaków), a film adaptation of the last script written by Andrzej Żuławski and film Legions (Legiony), a historical epic drama set during Great War.

In November 2019 he will release his debut hip-hop album titled Synteza.

Filmography (original titles)

Film 
 2009: Pekin Bielański as Globus
 2010: Mój Weltschmerz (short) as Michał
 2013: Strażnicy (short) as Marek
 2014: Pod Mocnym Aniołem as young „Engineer”
 2014: Facet (nie)potrzebny od zaraz as a guy screaming into the phone
 2014: Miasto 44 as „Sagan”
 2014: Jeziorak as aspirant Wojciech Marzec
 2015: Panie Dulskie as Zbyszko Dulski
 2016: #WszystkoGra as Staszek Borucki
 2016: Nowy świat: Azzam as soldier Artur
 2016: Pitbull. Niebezpieczne kobiety as Remigiusz Puchalski „Cukier”
 2017: Gwiazdy as Ginter
 2017: Botoks as Marek Brzyski
 2018:  as Artur Ostrowski „Cieniu”
 2018: Kamerdyner as Mateusz Kroll
 2018: Portrecista (short) as Wilhelm Brasse
 2019: Legiony as Józek „Wieża”
 2019: Mowa Ptaków as Marian
 2020: Psy 3 as Damian
 2021: Inni Ludzie as Jezus
 TBA: Portrecista as Mieczyslaw Morawa

TV 
 2009: Plebania as Majkel (episodes 1215–1216)
 2009: Tancerze as Piotr Treblicki (episodes 1–20)
 2010: 1920. Wojna i miłość as Niewczas (episodes 8–9, 11–12)
 2011: Linia życia as Kamil Nowik
 2011: Przepis na życie as nurse Przemek Trok (episodes 16–17)
 2011: Układ Warszawski as Hubert Cichocki (episode 7)
 2012: Misja Afganistan as private first class Emil Hołubiczko „Młody”
 2014: Prawo Agaty as private Grzegorz Faber (episodes 68, 69)
 2015: Strażacy as Maciek Zajda (episodes 2–10)
 2015–2016: Pakt as Patryk (episodes 3–4, 6–12)
 2016: Belfer as Adrian Kuś (episodes 2–9)
 2017-2019: Ultraviolet as Michał Holender
 2018: Botoks as Marek Brzyski vel Małgorzata Brzyska
 2018:  as Artur Ostrowski „Cieniu”
 2022: Kamerdyner as Mateusz Kroll

Polish dubbing 
 2015: Star Wars: The Force Awakens as Finn
 2016: Lego Gwiezdne wojny: Przebudzenie Mocy (video game) as Finn
 2017: Star Wars: The Last Jedi as Finn
 2018: Black Panther as Erik „Killmonger” Stevens
 2019: The Angry Birds Movie 2 as Chuck

Theatre 
 2014: Ecce Homo as David Hertzfeld - Theatre Collegium Nobilium, Warsaw

Discography

Albums 
 2020: Primityw

Soundtracks 
 2016: #WszystkoGra
 Małe tęsknoty
 Ale wkoło jest wesoło
 Bossanowa do poduszki

Music Videos 
 2016: Ale wkoło jest wesoło by Sebastian Fabijański, Eliza Rycembel, Karolina Czarnecka and Irena Melcer (for film #WszystkoGra)
 2018: Stare Drzewa by Kortez (for film Kamerdyner)

References

External links
 

1987 births
Living people
21st-century Polish male actors
Male actors from Warsaw
Polish male television actors
Polish male film actors
Polish male voice actors
Polish rappers